Scott M. Potasnik (born October 28, 1975) is an American journalist, television host, producer and actor. He was a host of Sexcetera, a travel adventure docu-series. Potasnik is also the co-creator and host of Too Much for TV, a pay per view travel show that aired on iNDEMAND, Host of the Splash News celebrity news pilot and creator and producer of Tokin' Trash, a pilot for Comedy Central. Potasnik has also served as director of production for Mantra Films, production coordinator for the MTV series Jackass, and a producer for MTV series The Lyricist Lounge Show.

Beginning in 2014, Scott could be heard on The Bob and Tom Show, a syndicated morning radio comedy program based in Indianapolis, Indiana. He was known as their "sex desk" correspondent and "fact checker." In 2016 Potasnik became a full-time member of the show with the retirement of Bob Kevoian. Sometime in July 2016 after the return of Kristi Lee, Potasnik and Pat Carlini disappeared without a trace from the show. It appears comedian Josh Arnold was hired to replace Potasnik.

Early life
Scott Potasnik was born in Indianapolis, Indiana the son of Cynthia Edwards and Michael Potasnik. He attended Carmel High School and Ball State University.

References

Sources

External links 
 Potasnik Productions
 
 Too much for TV

American television personalities
Living people
1975 births